Mount Dione is a  summit located in the Tantalus Range, in Tantalus Provincial Park, in southwestern British Columbia, Canada. The Dione Glacier lies on the southern slope, and the Rumbling Glacier lies to the northeast. Precipitation runoff from the peak drains east into tributaries of the Squamish River, or west into tributaries of the Clowhom River. The first ascent of the mountain was made in 1916 by Tom Fyles and his brother, John Fyles, via the southeast ridge. The mountain names in the Tantalus Range have a Greek mythology theme, and Mount Dione was named for Dione, the wife of Tantalus. The mountain's name was submitted by Neal Carter of the British Columbia Mountaineering Club, and was officially adopted on June 6, 1957, by the Geographical Names Board of Canada.

Climate
Based on the Köppen climate classification, Mount Dione is located in the marine west coast climate zone of western North America. Most weather fronts originate in the Pacific Ocean, and travel east toward the Coast Mountains where they are forced upward by the range (Orographic lift), causing them to drop their moisture in the form of rain or snowfall. As a result, the Coast Mountains experience high precipitation, especially during the winter months in the form of snowfall. Temperatures can drop below −20 °C with wind chill factors below −30 °C. The months July through September offer the most favorable weather for climbing Dione.

Climbing Routes
Established rock climbing routes on Mount Dione:

 Southeast Ridge -  First Ascent 1916
 West Face -   FA 1996 
 West Buttress -  FA 2002

See also

 Mount Niobe (Niobe, daughter of Dione)
 Geography of British Columbia
 Geology of British Columbia

References

External links

 Weather: Mount Dione
 Mt. Dione aerial photo: PBase

Dione
Dione
Dione
New Westminster Land District